Oecomys bicolor, also known as the white-bellied oecomys or bicolored arboreal rice rat, is a species of rodent in the genus Oecomys of family Cricetidae. It has a wide distribution in the Amazon biome, occurring in northwestern Brazil, northern Bolivia, eastern Peru, eastern Ecuador, eastern Colombia, much of Venezuela, Guyana, Suriname, and French Guiana, and extends into eastern Panama, but it may contain more than one species.

References

Literature cited
Musser, G.G. and Carleton, M.D. 2005. Superfamily Muroidea. Pp. 894–1531 in Wilson, D.E. and Reeder, D.M. (eds.). Mammal Species of the World: a taxonomic and geographic reference. 3rd ed. Baltimore: The Johns Hopkins University Press, 2 vols., 2142 pp. 
Pino, J., Patton, J., Catzeflis, F., Weksler, M., Bonvicino, C., Costa, L. and Emmons, L. 2008. . In IUCN. IUCN Red List of Threatened Species. Version 2009.2. <www.iucnredlist.org>. Downloaded on November 30, 2009.

Oecomys
Mammals described in 1860
Rodents of South America
Mammals of Colombia
Taxa named by Robert Fisher Tomes